The German Academic Scholarship Foundation (German: , or Studienstiftung for short) is Germany's largest and most prestigious scholarship foundation. According to its statutes, it supports "the university education of young people who, on account of their exceptional academic or artistic talents and their personalities, can be expected to make an outstanding contribution to society as a whole". The Studienstiftung is non-political, non-denominational and ideologically independent. Its headquarters are located in Bonn; it also has an office in Berlin. The current president is Reinhard Zimmermann, and the President of Germany, Frank-Walter Steinmeier, is patron.

The Studienstiftung, like 12 other scholarship foundations, is funded by the German Federal Ministry of Education and Research, with funds from the federal government, the German federal states and local authorities, numerous foundations and businesses as well as numerous private donors. In 2015, the Studienstiftung's budget was over €103 million.

The selection process is extremely rigorous and only those students who show outstanding academic and personal promise are chosen. The Studienstiftung awards scholarships to fewer than 0.5% of German students. It is often referred to as Germany's "secret elite university".

Initially founded in Dresden in 1925 as a department of the Deutsche Studentenschaft, an amalgamation of German student committees, the Studienstiftung des deutschen Volkes was dissolved in 1934 under National Socialism and replaced by the "Reichsförderung", a department of the newly founded Reichsstudentenwerk. The Studienstiftung des deutschen Volkes was newly formed as a registered association in Cologne in 1948.

Admission
The Studienstiftung offers a general scholarship for bachelor's and master's studies that consists of both financial and academic support. Eligibility is based on the criteria for BAFöG, the German state support system for students. The Studienstiftung scholarship accepts only applicants that study full time at university. A part of an applicant's university studies must be at a university in Germany, in another EU country, or in Switzerland. German or EU citizenship are not required, and there are no age criteria. 

The Studienstiftung accepts exceptionally talented students and doctoral candidates selected in accordance with its mission statement, which is based upon the principles of "excellence, initiative and responsibility". Scholarship holders (scholars) are admitted through various channels:
 Nomination by a school: The principal of a high school or school with an upper secondary level can nominate one in 50 senior students for admission to the Studienstiftung. This student must excel both academically and in terms of social commitment. Nominated students attend a three-day selection seminar where their eligibility for funding is assessed in individual interviews and group discussions. 23.8% of students nominated in 2015 were offered admission to the Studienstiftung. There is no set admissions quota for the number of students admitted each year.
 Nomination by professors: Students at universities and universities of applied science can be nominated directly by university teachers. Again, candidates attend a selection seminar. In 2015, 48.3% of students nominated by their professors were offered admission to the Studienstiftung.
 Nomination by an examination board: Just as students can be nominated by schools, one in every 50 students in the second academic year in his/her respective study programme can be nominated by universities and universities of applied science. The nomination must be supported by a professor. The selection seminar is organised along the same lines as the selection seminar for students nominated by schools. In this case, however, the candidate's proven academic achievements at university also carry weight. In 2015, 28.8% of nominees were offered admission.
 Winners of a national or federal competition or nomination by select cooperation partners: Winners of or participants in various competitions on a national, federal or international level (e.g. Bundeswettbewerb Informatik, Bundeswettbewerb Mathematik, Bundeswettbewerb Fremdsprachen, Jugend forscht, Jugend debattiert, Internationale Mathematik-Olympiade, Internationale Physik-Olympiade, Altsprachenwettbewerb des Landes Baden-Württemberg) may be offered admission to the Studienstiftung. Select cooperation partners (e.g. START-Stiftung) may also nominate potential sponsorship candidates.
 Since February 2010, candidates can also put themselves forward for a scholarship. First and second-semester students can sign up for the Studienstiftung assessment test in January/February/March each year. The test is held at test centres throughout Germany. The applicants with the best results are invited to attend the selection seminar. While the assessment test determines applicants' cognitive abilities, the selection seminar focuses on motivation, extracurricular interests, social commitment and social skills, which are assessed in personal interviews and group discussions.
 Nomination by alums: Studienstiftung alums may also nominate students who they consider appropriate, having taught them personally in school or university courses.
 Support of musicians and artists: After an internal pre-selection procedure, universities can nominate students of the fine arts, music and the performing arts for participation in a Studienstiftung selection seminar.
If admission occurs before the end of the fourth semester, sponsorship is usually granted until the end of the sixth semester. An extension of the scholarship beyond the sixth semester usually depends on academic performance in the first four semesters. In borderline cases, aspects other than academic achievements – such as exceptional social engagement or particular personal circumstances – may positively influence the decision to approve further funding. After an application has been approved, funding is awarded from the 6th semester until studies are completed (for example, until the master's degree or state examinations have been completed). In 2014, 91% of requests for further funding were approved.

The Studienstiftung also offers a doctoral scholarship for highly qualified and prosocial PhD students. The doctoral scholarship accepts applications from doctoral candidates at universities in Germany and at universities worldwide under certain conditions.

Scholarships

General scholarship for undergraduate, graduate and PhD students
The general Studienstiftung scholarship consists of both financial and academic support.

Financial support 

Financial support includes an allowance (€300 monthly). Scholars can receive a need-based basic scholarship, which is calculated according to the BAföG (Federal Training Assistance Act) and can be up to €744 per month.

PhD scholars receive a monthly award of  €1,350 plus a research allowance of €100. Additional funds are provided for students and PhD students with children. Financial support is regulated by the guidelines of the German Ministry of Education and Research (BMBF).
Visits abroad are also supported by grants or overseas allowances and the partial payment of tuition fees. Under the terms of No. 11 Einkommensteuergesetz (EStG – German Income Tax Law) scholarship payments are tax-free.

Academic support 
The Studienstiftung's academic support includes summer schools, research groups, language courses, workshops and mentoring by local tutors, academics who carry out this task for the Studienstiftung on a voluntary basis. Scholars are required to submit a report on their studies and other activities every semester during the first semesters (usually until the end of the fourth semester), and once a year thereafter. Scholars can also apply for funding in order to organise their own conferences and other events.

Studienstiftung offers yearly two-week subsidised summer academies which are its "central event format" for scholarship holders. Scholars themselves can also organise shorter academies and benefit from similar subsidisation. For instance, queer scholarship holders have been making use of this possibility to organise annual meetings since 2001.

Internal scholarship programmes 

In addition to its regular scholarship scheme, the Studienstiftung offers internal scholarship programmes for selected scholars and alumni. Examples include the KAUST-Studienstiftung programme, a joint partnership between the Saudi Arabian King Abdullah University of Science and Technology (KAUST) and the Studienstiftung under the patronage of the German Federal Foreign Office which allows scholars from the STEM disciplines to join KAUST for research internships or to enrol in Master or PhD programs. In the musical field, for example, in cooperation with the Beethoven House residence scholarships are awarded for young composers.

Open scholarship programmes 

Moreover, the Studienstiftung offers open scholarship programmes, which are run and financed in cooperation with other organisations. They include the McCloy Academic Scholarship Program, the ERP-Stipendienprogramm and the Carlo-Schmid-Programm. Participation in these scholarship programmes does not require previously holding a regular scholarship by the Studienstiftung. 

Since 2005 the Studienstiftung has also been running the Max Weber scholarship for students in Bavaria, introduced by the regional administration via the Bavarian Elite Support Act (BayEFG).

Statistics 
 In 2020, the Studienstiftung approved 2,898 scholarships and 362 doctoral scholarships.:109,120
 , 71.1% of scholars received a study expense allowance of €300, 18.8% received a partial need-based scholarship, and 10.1% the maximum need-based scholarship.:114
 52.7% of scholars  were women.:112

Notable alums

Natural sciences

 Martin Beneke, physicist, Leibniz prize 2008
 Manfred Eigen, Nobel prize chemistry 1962, president of the Studienstiftung 1982–1993
 Gerd Faltings, mathematician, Fields medal 1986
 Reinhard Genzel, Nobel prize physics 2020
 Magdalena Götz, biologist, Leibniz prize 2007
 Robert Huber, Nobel prize chemistry 1988
 Joachim Frank, Nobel prize chemistry 2017
 J. Hans D. Jensen, Nobel prize physics 1963
 Wolfgang Ketterle, Nobel prize physics 2001
 Christian Keysers, neuroscientist
 Wolfgang Lück, mathematician, Leibniz prize 2008
 Jochen Mannhart, physicist, Leibniz prize 2008
 Erwin Neher, Nobel prize medicine 1991
 Felix Otto, mathematician, Leibniz prize 2006
 Peter Scholze, mathematician, Fields medal 2018
 Bernhard Schölkopf, computer scientist, Leibniz prize 2018
 Detlef Weigel, biologist, Leibniz prize 2007

Social sciences 

 Ulrich Beck, sociologist
 Dirk Kaesler, sociologist
 Ulrike Malmendier, economist
 Ulrike Müßig, legal historian
 Stephan Reimertz, art historian
 Ernst-Ludwig von Thadden, economist
 Michèle Tertilt, economist, Leibniz prize 2019
 Reinhard Zimmermann, legal historian, Leibniz prize 1996 (Studienstiftung president 2011–)

Business and NGOs

 Andreas von Bechtolsheim, co-founder Sun Microsystems
Wolfgang Bernhard, member of the board of management of Daimler AG
 Alexander Dibelius, managing director, Germany, Goldman Sachs
 Frank Mattern, head of the German Office, McKinsey and Company

Politics and civil service

 Fritz Kuhn, politician, co-chairman of Bündnis 90/Die Grünen, the German Green Party, from June 2000 to December 2002
 Andreas Paulus, judge at the Federal Constitutional Court of Germany
Frauke Petry, politician and former chair of the Alternative for Germany
Karl Schiller, politician and scientist, former Federal Minister of Finance of Germany
Gesine Schwan, professor, SPD-candidate for the office of the federal president, 2004
Steffen Seibert, journalist, former government spokesman and head of the Press and Information Office of Germany
Robert Tillmanns, politician, former Federal Minister of Germany
 Christine Teusch, politician, Minister of Education of North Rhine-Westphalia from 1947 to 1954, and as such the first female Minister in Germany
Antje Vollmer, politician, until 2005 vice-president of the German parliament

Arts

 Mechthild Bach, soprano
Hans-Jürgen von Bose, professor, composer
 Hans Breder, professor, artist
Christa Dichgans, writer
 Moritz Eggert, composer, pianist
 Hans Magnus Enzensberger, writer
 Justus Frantz, pianist
 Anna Gourari, pianist
 Horst Janssen, artist
 Bas Kast, writer
 Heinz Rudolf Kunze, singer and composer
 Michael Kunze, librettist and translator
Igor Levit, pianist
 Frei Otto, architect
 Matthias Pintscher, composer
 Philipp Tingler, writer, journalist and economist
 Juli Zeh, writer

Journalism

 Petra Gerster, journalist
 Claus Kleber, journalist, anchor of the "heute-journal"
 Ulrike Meinhof, editor, subsequently member of the Red Army Faction (RAF)
 Frank Schirrmacher, journalist

See also
 Swiss Study Foundation (Schweizerische Studienstiftung)
 National Merit Scholarship Program in the United States

Notes

References

Further reading 
 Nik Afanasjew: RAF und die Studienstiftung: Aus Stipendiaten wurden Terroristen. In: Der Tagesspiegel. 3. Oktober 2011.
Anant Agarwala: Wie sich die Stipendiaten der Studienstiftung ändern. Die Spitze wird bunter, in: Die Zeit 21/2016.
 Zentrum für Evaluation und Methoden (ZEM) der Universität Bonn:  Evaluierung des Auswahlverfahrens der Studienstiftung des deutschen Volkes e.V., Bonn 2012.

External links
 Alumni der Studienstiftung e.V.

Scholarships in Germany
Education in Germany
Organisations based in Bonn
Government scholarships